Voltor (English: Vulture) is a hardcore-ska band from Aldaia, Spain. Their strong social lyrics talk about current issues like freedom of speech, defense of a territory and its roots as well as social justice.

History

Voltor formed in 2002 but it wasn't until two years later that they recorded their first demo. It was called "Identitat" (Identity) and was made up of live songs at Rock Sala (Quart de Poblet) and it included songs like Identitat and Solidaritat. However recorded with some defects it made them known to a wider number of people.

After a line-up reorganisation, some members left the band and five more joined, their first studio album was released in 2005, Aprenent a volar (Learning to fly) consisting of 9 songs, including the highlighted ones of Encén L'oïda (a radio programme which Voltor support and take part), an improved version of Solidaritat, Extrem o Quan no quede res (when it's all gone) with the collaboration of Obrint Pas singer Xavi Sarriá.

Discography

Albums
 Identitat - 2004
 Aprenent a volar - 2005

External links
 Official webpage of Voltor 
 Encén L'oïda - 98.2FM (Adaia Ràdio) 
 Voltor at Lallum.org 
 Cambra Records 
 Lyrics 

Catalan music
Musicians from the Valencian Community
Spanish hardcore punk groups
Spanish ska groups